Hanover Senior High School is located at 401 Moul Ave, Hanover, Pennsylvania. It is part of the Hanover Public School District. According to the National Center for Education Statistics, in 2018–2019, the school reported an enrollment of 481 pupils in grades 9th through 12th.  The school employed 35.56 full-time-equivalent teachers, yielding a student–teacher ratio of 13.53:1.The school's colors are orange and black, and the mascot is the Nighthawk.

Extracurriculars
The high school's students have access to a variety of clubs, activities and an extensive sports program.

Sports
The District funds:

Boys
Baseball - AA
Basketball- AA
Football - AA
Golf - AA
Soccer - A
Tennis - AA
Track and Field - AA
Wrestling - AA

Girls
Basketball - AA
Field Hockey - AA
Soccer (Fall) - A
Softball - AA
Girls' Tennis - AA
Track and Field - AA
Volleyball - AA

Middle School Sports

Boys
Basketball
Cross Country
Football
Soccer
Track and Field
Wrestling	

Girls
Basketball
Cross Country
Field Hockey
Soccer
Track and Field
Volleyball

References

Public high schools in Pennsylvania
Hanover, Pennsylvania
Schools in York County, Pennsylvania